Jonathan Marks may refer to:

Jonathan Marks, Baron Marks of Henley-on-Thames (born 1952), British barrister and Liberal Democrat peer
Jonathan M. Marks (born 1955), American biological anthropologist at the University of North Carolina at Charlotte

See also
Jon Marks (1947–2007), British jazz pianist
John Marks (disambiguation)